Pedro Medina (1883 – death date unknown) was a Cuban pitcher in the Negro leagues and Cuban League in the 1900s.

A native of Cuba, Medina played in the Negro leagues for the Cuban Stars (West) in 1906 and 1907. He also played several seasons in the Cuban League for the Almendares, Club Fé, Habana, and Matanzas clubs.

References

External links
 and Seamheads

1883 births
Date of birth missing
Year of death missing
Place of birth missing
Place of death missing
Almendares (baseball) players
Club Fé players
Cuban Stars (West) players
Habana players
Matanzas players